Thomas Metzinger (born 12 March 1958) is a German philosopher and professor of theoretical philosophy at the Johannes Gutenberg University of Mainz. , he is an Adjunct Fellow at the Frankfurt Institute for Advanced Studies, a co-founder of the German Effective Altruism Foundation, president of the Barbara Wengeler Foundation,  and on the advisory board of the Giordano Bruno Foundation. From 2008 to 2009 he served as a Fellow at the Berlin Institute for Advanced Study; from 2014 to 2019 he was a Fellow at the Gutenberg Research College; from 2019 to 2022 he was awarded a Senior-Forschungsprofessur by the Ministry of Science, Education and Culture. From 2018 to 2020 Metzinger worked as a member of the European Commission’s High-Level Expert Group on Artificial Intelligence.

Metzinger is a founding member of the Association for the Scientific Study of Consciousness, where he was a member of the board from 1995 to 2008 the president from 2009 to 2011.

Bibliography
Monographs
(1985) Neuere Beiträge zur Diskussion des Leib-Seele-Problems. Peter Lang, Frankfurt am Main, 
(1993) Subjekt und Selbstmodell. Die Perspektivität phänomenalen Bewußtseins vor dem Hintergrund einer naturalistischen Theorie mentaler Repräsentation. mentis, Paderborn, 
(2003) Being No One. The Self-Model Theory of Subjectivity. MIT Press, Cambridge, Massachusetts.,  (Hardcover)/ (Paperback)
(2009) The Ego Tunnel - The Science of the Mind and the Myth of the Self Basic Books, New York, 
(2009) Der Ego-Tunnel - Eine neue Philosophie des Selbst: Von der Hirnforschung zur Bewusstseinsethik  Berlin Verlag, Berlin, 
(2010) Der Ego Tunnel. Eine neue Philosophie des Selbst: Von der Hirnforschung zur Bewusstseinsethik. Berlin: Berlin Verlag. eBook 
(2011) Being No One. The Self-Model Theory of Subjectivity. Cambridge MA: MIT Press. Kindle edition; ASIN: B004ELBJ56

Editorship
(1995) Bewußtsein – Beiträge aus der Gegenwartsphilosophie., Paderborn, mentis, Paderborn, 
(1995) Conscious Experience. Imprint Academic, Thorverton und mentis, Paderborn,  (Hardcover)
(2000) Neural Correlates of Consciousness – Empirical and Conceptual Questions. MIT Press, Cambridge, Massachusetts.,  (Hardcover)
(2006) Grundkurs Philosophie des Geistes – Band 1: Phänomenales Bewusstsein mentis, Paderborn, 
(2007) Grundkurs Philosophie des Geistes – Band 2: Das Leib-Seele-Problem mentis, Paderborn, 
(2010) Grundkurs Philosophie des Geistes – Band 3: Intentionalität und mentale Repräsentation mentis Paderborn, . All three volumes can be purchased for 78 Euros, .
(2015, with Jennifer M. Windt). Open MIND-collection, Frankfurt am Main: MIND Group. .
(2017, with Wanja Wiese). Philosophy and Predictive Processing-collection, Frankfurt am Main: MIND Group. .
(2020, with Raphaël Millière). Radical Disruptions of Self-Consciousness, Frankfurt am Main: MIND Group. .

External links
English Homepage

References 

1958 births
Living people
Academic staff of Johannes Gutenberg University Mainz
20th-century German philosophers
21st-century German philosophers
German consciousness researchers and theorists
Philosophers of mind
German male writers
Anti-natalists